Kubuqi Desert is a desert within the Ordos Basin in northwestern China, under the administration of the Inner Mongolian prefecture of Ordos City.

Desertification
The area had gone through desertification due to overgrazing.

Restoration
Starting in 1988, the Elion Resources Group and the Government of Beijing worked to reverse desertification and restore the environment. Since then one third of the desert has had greenery restored.

References

Deserts of China
Geography of Inner Mongolia
Geography of Shaanxi
Geography of Gansu
Geography of Ningxia
Ecoregions of China
Ergs
Ordos City